Binpur Assembly constituency is an assembly constituency in Jhargram district in the Indian state of West Bengal. It is reserved for scheduled tribes.

Overview
As per orders of the Delimitation Commission, No. 237 Binpur Assembly constituency (ST) is composed of the following: Binpur II community development block and Jamboni CD Block.

Binpur Assembly constituency is part of No. 33 Jhargram (Lok Sabha constituency).

Election results

2021

2016

2011

1977-2006
In 2006 state assembly elections, Chunibala Hansda of Jharkhand Party (Naren) won the Binpur (ST) assembly seat defeating her nearest rival Sambhu Nath Mandi of CPI(M). Contests in most years were multi cornered but only winners and runners are being mentioned. Sambhu Nath Mandi of CPI(M) defeated Chunibala Hansda of Jharkhand Party (Naren)/ Independent in 2001. Naren Hansda of Jharkhand Party (Naren) defeated Durga Tudu of CPI(M) in 1996 and 1991. Durga Tudu of CPI(M) defeated Panchanan Hansda of Congress in 1987. Sambhu Nath Mandi of CPI(M) defeated Naren Hansda, Independent, in 1982 and Dakhin Murmu of Janata Party in 1977.

1951-1972
Joyram Soren of CPI won in 1972. Shyam Charan Murmu of Jharkhand Party won in 1971. Joyram Soren of CPI won in 1969. Mangal Chandra Saren of Congress won in 1967 and 1962. Sudhir Kumar Pandey and Jamadar Hansda, both of CPI, won in 1957. In independent India's first election in 1951, Mangal Chandra Saren and Nripendra Gopal Mitra, both of Congress, won the Binpur dual seat.

References

Assembly constituencies of West Bengal
Politics of Jhargram district